Fort Mellieħa or Mellieħa Fort, also known as Il-Fortizza tas-Salib (meaning Fort of the Cross), is a World War II-era fort in Mellieħa, Malta. It was built by the British on top of Mellieħa Hill, to serve as a civil defence depot and an observation post. The structure is lightly fortified by a perimeter wall.

The fort is now surrounded by residential buildings. On December 28 1991, the Lands Department leased it to the Mellieħa Scout Group, who restored the building, and now use it as their headquarters. It is the largest scouts headquarters in Malta, and it includes kitchens, dormitories, a campsite and underground shelters.

References

Mellieħa
Mellieha
Mellieha
20th-century fortifications
World War II sites in Malta
Civil defense
Headquarters in Malta
Scouting and Guiding in Malta